National Highway 515 (NH 515) is a National Highway in the Northeastern Indian states of Assam and Arunachal Pradesh. NH 515 starts at the intersection of NH 15 north of Dhemaji and generally traverses east and northeast.

See also
 List of National Highways in India (by Highway Number)
 National Highways Development Project

External links
 NH 515 on OpenStreetMap

References

515
515
National highways in India